Casey Silver (born Andrew Silver; May 5, 1955) is an American film executive and producer.

Former chairman and chief executive officer of Universal Pictures, Casey Silver began his career in the motion picture industry as a screenwriter. After serving as assistant to director Adrian Lyne on Flashdance, he became director of development and production for Simpson-Bruckheimer Productions, where he was instrumental in the development of the original Beverly Hills Cop and Top Gun.

In his role at Universal, Silver was responsible for all divisions of Universal Pictures, including its production, marketing and distribution operations. He supervised all activities worldwide concerning Universal's partnerships with United International and domestic distribution activities through its partnership with October Films. Additionally, Silver oversaw Universal Studios Home Video, Universal Pictures Animation and Visual Effects, and Universal Family & Home Entertainment Production, which included Universal Cartoon Studios.

During his tenure at Universal, the studio developed, produced and released the critically acclaimed films Schindler's List, Shakespeare in Love, Apollo 13, Casino, Jurassic Park, Out of Sight, Field of Dreams, Twelve Monkeys, In the Name of the Father, Do the Right Thing, Scent of a Woman, Born on the Fourth of July, Dazed and Confused, Midnight Run, American Pie and Gladiator.

Prior to joining Universal, Silver served as TriStar Pictures vice president of production, and was then promoted to senior vice president of production.

Silver served as executive producer on Netflix's first original limited series Godless, a seven-part cinematic event from Golden Globe-nominated screenwriter and director Scott Frank (Out of Sight, Get Shorty). Nominated for 11 Primetime Emmy Awards, the lauded series won in three categories, including: Supporting Actress for Merritt Wever, and Supporting Actor for Jeff Daniels. Godless aired on Netflix in 2017.

Through his shingle, Casey Silver Productions, Silver produced The Highwaymen starring Kevin Costner and Woody Harrelson, Hidalgo starring Viggo Mortensen, Ladder 49 starring Joaquin Phoenix and John Travolta, Leatherheads starring George Clooney and John Krasinski and The Forbidden Kingdom starring Jet Li and Jackie Chan.

Silver is also a founding member and CEO of the start-up PodOp. The company's first transmedia project, Mosaic, was executive produced by Silver. Directed by Steven Soderbergh and starring Sharon Stone, Mosaic aired on HBO in 2017.

Most recently, Silver completed production on Steven Soderbergh's No Sudden Move for HBO Max.  The all-star lineup includes Don Cheadle, Benicio del Toro, David Harbour, Jon Hamm, Brendan Fraser, Ray Liotta, Kieran Culkin, Amy Seimetz, Julia Fox, Bill Duke, Noah Jupe and Frankie Shaw.

Filmography
He was a producer in all films unless otherwise noted.

Film

Miscellaneous crew

Thanks

Television

Thanks

References

External links

American film producers
American entertainment industry businesspeople
Place of birth missing (living people)
Living people
1955 births